Paint Township is one of the fourteen townships of Holmes County, Ohio, United States. As of the 2010 census the population was 4,134, up from 3,547 in 2000.

According to the 2021 American Community Survey's 5-Year Estimates, 16.2% of the township's population spoke only English, while 83.8% spoke an "other [than Spanish] Indo-European language."

Geography
Located in the northeastern corner of the county, it borders the following townships:
Paint Township, Wayne County - north
Sugar Creek Township, Stark County - northeast
Wayne Township, Tuscarawas County - southeast
Walnut Creek Township - south
Berlin Township - southwest corner
Salt Creek Township - west
Salt Creek Township, Wayne County - northwest corner

It is the only township in the county to border Stark County.

No municipalities are located in Paint Township, although the unincorporated community of Winesburg lies in the southwestern part of the township.

Name and history
Paint Township most likely was named for a local spring where the water was imparted with a reddish hue.  It is one of six Paint Townships statewide.

Government
The township is governed by a three-member board of trustees, who are elected in November of odd-numbered years to a four-year term beginning on the following January 1. Two are elected in the year after the presidential election and one is elected in the year before it. There is also an elected township fiscal officer, who serves a four-year term beginning on April 1 of the year after the election, which is held in November of the year before the presidential election. Vacancies in the fiscal officership or on the board of trustees are filled by the remaining trustees.

References

External links
County website

Townships in Holmes County, Ohio
Townships in Ohio